A Visit to the Seaside (1908) was the first successful motion picture filmed in Kinemacolor. It is an 8-minute short film directed by George Albert Smith of Brighton, showing people doing everyday activities. It is ranked of high historical importance. Kinemacolor later influenced and was replaced by Technicolor, which was used from 1916 to 1952.

References

External links

 
 Movie on YouTube

1908 films
1900s British films
1900s color films
British silent short films
British short documentary films
Films set in Brighton
1900s short documentary films
Documentary films about England
Films directed by George Albert Smith
Articles containing video clips
Silent films in color
Early color films